Andriy Yosypovych Bohdan (born on 3 December 1976) is a Ukrainian lawyer and former Head of the Presidential Administration. On 21 May 2019 President Volodymyr Zelensky appointed Bohdan to lead this office. He was responsible for communication, legal and political issues. Zelensky dismissed him on 11 February 2020. In the past, he was the personal lawyer of oligarch Ihor Kolomoisky.

In 2007, Bohdan was honoured with the title Honored Lawyer of Ukraine.

Biography

Education
Bohdan studied law and economy at the Lviv University. He received an academic degree (candidate) of juridical sciences (Doctor of Law). In 2007 he received his second higher education at the same university, obtaining the qualification of an economist, a specialist in finance.

Career
In the 2007 Ukrainian parliamentary election Bohdan was candidate for People's Deputy from the Our Ukraine–People's Self-Defense Bloc, No. 93 on the list. At election time he was a managing partner of the law firm "Legal Counsel Lawyers". He was not elected but instead following the election he became an assistant to MP Andrey Portnov of the Yulia Tymoshenko Bloc.

Bohdan was Deputy Minister of Justice from 2008 to 2010. In 2010 he was appointed Deputy Minister of the Cabinet of Ministers.  Bohdan worked as the Government Commissioner for Anticorruption Policy of the first and second Azarov Government terms (2010–2014).

In the 2014 Ukrainian parliamentary election Bohdan was again a candidate for People's Deputy this time on the election list of Petro Poroshenko Bloc, No. 74 on the national list. At election time he was a jurisconsult of the law firm "Status". Although Petro Poroshenko Bloc won 132 seats in this election, 63 seats were won on its national list (the other seats were won in constituencies).

Following the election Bohdan worked as the adviser to the Governor of Dnipropetrovsk Oblast Ihor Kolomoyskyi, and represented him as lawyer in the legal disputes over Privatbank.

On 21 May 2019, President Volodymyr Zelensky appointed Bohdan Head of the Presidential Administration Within four days 25,000 Ukrainians signed an electronic petition for the dismissal of Bohdan from this post claiming he could not have been appointed because he falls under Lustration laws because of his work for the Azarov Government. The head of the Public Council on lustration issues at the Justice Ministry, Tetyana Kozachenko, also claimed on 22 May 2019 that Zelenskiy's appointment of Bohdan violated the legislation on lustration.

On 2 August 2019, Interfax-Ukraine reported that Bohdan had filed his resignation letter the previous day. The same day, President Zelensky stated that he had not signed Bohdan's resignation letter and claimed that "all the people who came with me" had signed resignation letters in advance so they could be removed from their post when "society or president feels that this or that person fails to cope with the goals set for Ukraine."

In December 2019, Bohdan was included in the list of the 100 most influential Ukrainians by Focus magazine, taking the second place.

Zelensky dismissed Bohdan as Head of his presidential administration on 11 February 2020. He was immediately replaced by Andriy Yermak.

Investigations 
Bohdan was involved in a criminal case by the GPU, he is suspected of influencing court decisions, according to which Ukraine was obliged to pay Russia UAH 3.2 billion under the guarantees of the United Energy Systems company. Draft notifications of suspicions were prepared in the case, but the GPU leadership blocked further investigation.

In December 2019, a lawsuit was opened against Bohdan by Mykhailo Nonyak, the former head of Ukrtransbezpeky. Nonyak demands that Bohdan's demand to bring Nonyak to justice and his subsequent dismissal be declared illegal.

In addition, on 19–20 November 2019, the anonymous Telegram Channel "Trumpet Breakthrough" began publishing recordings from the office of the Director of the State Bureau of Investigation Roman Truba, the content of which showed that the bureau was fulfilling political orders. In particular, it was an order of the head of the Office of the President of Ukraine Andriy Bohdan regarding the illegal persecution of the fifth President of Ukraine and members of his team.

Journalistic investigations 
Journalists of the program "Our Money" Denys Bigus found out that Bohdan is involved in offshore, which engaged in credit scams for hundreds of millions of hryvnia. He owns an estate in Koncha Zaspa and large plots of land in the Kyiv Oblast, which he bought while working in the civil service. Journalists claim that Bohdan advised on how to carry out credit fraud.

Personal life
Father — Bohdan Yosyp Hnatovych (Associate Professor of Civil Law and Procedure of Lviv National University).

Divorced, has 4 daughters: Victoria, Anastasia, Catherine and Sofia.

He is dating Anastasia Slichna (since 2018).

Bohdan is a Greek Catholic.

See also
Trump–Ukraine scandal

References

External links

 

1976 births
Living people
Lawyers from Lviv
Politicians from Lviv
University of Lviv alumni
21st-century Ukrainian lawyers
Head of the Presidential Administration of Ukraine
Ukrainian civil servants
Our Ukraine (political party) politicians
Petro Poroshenko Bloc politicians
Independent politicians in Ukraine
21st-century Ukrainian politicians
National Security and Defense Council of Ukraine
Recipients of the Honorary Diploma of the Cabinet of Ministers of Ukraine